L. niger may refer to:
 Lasius niger, the black garden ant, a formicine ant species found all over Europe
 Lathyrus niger, the black pea, blackening flat pea and black bitter vetch, a perennial legume species native to Europe

Synonyms
 Lablab niger, a synonym for Lablab purpureus, the hyacinth bean, a plant species

See also
 Niger (disambiguation)